DST Group Brunei Premier League was the top-tier football league of Brunei until 2012, when it became the second tier of the football pyramid of Brunei with the creation of the Brunei Super League by the National Football Association of Brunei Darussalam.

History
From 1985 to 1993, the champions of the four districts (Belait, Brunei-Muara, Temburong, Tutong) entered into the National Championship playoff. The tournament was not played between 1994 and 2001. The Brunei Premier League was created in 2002, and it was the top-tier league until 2012, when it was replaced by the Brunei Super League.

From 2014 until 2019 it was made into a second tier competition.

Teams

A total of 8 teams competed in the 2018–19 season.

BSRC FT
DPMM FC II
Jerudong FC
Panchor Murai FC
Rainbow FC
Rimba Star FC
Seri Wira FC
Tabuan Muda

Stadiums

Track & Field Sports Complex, Bandar Seri Begawan
Berakas Sports Complex, Berakas
Jerudong Park Mini Stadium, Jerudong
Tutong Sports Complex, Tutong
Brunei Shell Recreation Club Field, Panaga
NFABD Field, Bandar Seri Begawan

Champions
Previous winners are:
National Championship play-off winners:
1985: Angkatan Bersenjata
1986: Daerah Brunei
1987: Kota Ranger FC
1988: Kuala Belait FC
1989: Muara Stars FC
1990–92: not played
1993: Kota Ranger FC
1994-01: not played
Brunei Premier League (B-League)
2002: DPMM FC
2003: Wijaya FC
2004: DPMM FC
2005–06: QAF FC
2006–07: not held
2007–08: QAF FC
2008–09: not held
2009–10: QAF FC
2011: suspended
2014: Lun Bawang
2015: Kota Ranger FC
2016: Al-Idrus Junior
2017: Setia Perdana FC
2018–19: DPMM FC

Topscorers

References

External links
National Football Association of Brunei Darussalam 
League at fifa.com

 
2
Second level football leagues in Asia
Sports leagues established in 2002